Asiatown could refer to:
 Cebu IT Park, in the Philippines, is known as "Asiatown"
 Asiatown, Cleveland, an ethnic enclave in Cleveland, Ohio, U.S.
 Asia District, Oklahoma City
 Industrial Area (Doha)#Asian Town, in Qatar was built for the South Asian and Southeast Asian expatriate population in the country.

See also 
Asiatown could also be a generalization of Asian ethnic enclaves outside of Asia, more specific to a particular Asian culture.  
 Chinatown, an Asian ethnic enclave of Chinese people outside of China, Taiwan, Hong Kong and Macao
 Koreatown, an Asian ethnic enclave of Korean people outside of North and South Korea
 Little Saigon, an Asian ethnic enclave of Vietnamese people outside of Vietnam
 Japantown, an Asian ethnic enclave of Japanese people outside Japan
 Little India, an Asian ethnic enclave of Indian people outside of India
 Thai Town, an Asian ethnic enclave of Thai people outside of Thailand